Written Tycoon (foaled 6 September 2002) is a stakes winning Australian Thoroughbred racehorse and successful sire who has sired multiple Group 1 winners.

Racing career
Written Tycoon commenced his race career with an easy win at Randwick as a pronounced 7/4 favourite.

Two weeks later, he was narrowly beaten by filly Fashions Afield at Randwick. Fashions Afield would later frank the form in claiming the Sires' Produce Stakes and Reisling Stakes.

Written Tycoon then recorded his only other career victory when winning the Todman Stakes at Rosehill.

Written Tycoon was retired as a four-year old after finishing unplaced in the Challenge Stakes.

Stud career

Written Tycoon initially stood at Eliza Park Stud in Victoria, Australia for a service fee of A$6,600.   In 2013 he was relocated to Woodside Park Stud for a fee of $13,750. 
By 2018 his service fee had increased to $110,000.  In 2020 it was announced that Written Tycoon would be relocated to Arrowfield Stud in New South Wales.

Notable progeny

Written Tycoon's Group 1 winners:

'c = colt, f = filly, g = gelding

Pedigree

References 

Australian racehorses
Racehorses bred in Australia
Racehorses trained in Australia
2002 racehorse births